"Cry" is a song recorded by Swedish singer Dotter. The song was released as a digital download on 17 February 2018 and peaked at number 59 on the Swedish Singles Chart. It took part in Melodifestivalen 2018, and placed sixth in the third semi-final on 17 February 2018. It was written by Dotter along with Thomas G:son, Linnea Deb, and Peter Boström.

Charts

Release history

References

2018 singles
2017 songs
English-language Swedish songs
Melodifestivalen songs of 2018
Swedish pop songs
Warner Music Group singles
Songs written by Thomas G:son
Songs written by Linnea Deb
Songs written by Peter Boström
Songs written by Dotter (singer)
Dotter songs